PLMJ is a Portuguese law firm with its headquarters in Lisbon.

PLMJ is a full-service, multidisciplinary firm advising Portuguese and multinational businesses, and financial and state institutions on a range of domestic and international transactions. More than 280 lawyers including 57 partners and around 100 support staff work in PLMJ's nine offices spread across seven countries in Europe, Africa and Asia.

PLMJ is a member of World Services Group and World Law Group, two international multidisciplinary professional services networks of independent accounting and law firms.

History 

The firm PLMJ was founded in Lisbon in 1967, with the association between partners António Maria Pereira and Luís Sáragga Leal and, in the next decade, they were joined by new partners Francisco de Oliveira Martins and José Miguel Júdice.

In 1998, PLMJ moved to its current headquarters in Avenida da Liberdade, in the centre of Lisbon, at a time when it already had more than 100 lawyers. The new century marked the beginning of PLMJ's national expansion with the opening of offices in Faro in the Algarve in 2000 and two years later in the northern city of Oporto.

PLMJ began its international expansion in 2010 with the opening of the law firm Gabinete Legal Angola followed by TTA-Sociedade de Advogados the year after. In 2011, PLMJ established a partnership with DSL Lawyers in Macau, creating a network of international partners, PLMJ International Legal Network. In 2013 the firm opened a representative office in Switzerland and in March 2015 in the United Kingdom.

The policies of internationalisation and specialisation pursued by PLMJ since its first beginnings led to the firm's sustained growth.

PLMJ Colab 

PLMJ has built a network of partners in Portuguese-speaking countries and in the principal target markets for Portuguese investors, to provide legal advice without borders.

PLMJ Network is present in Angola, Mozambique, Brazil, Macau, Guinea-Bissau, São Tomé and Príncipe and Cape Verde but also extends to the main source markets for investment in Portuguese-speaking countries, principally China and the countries of Central and Eastern Europe.

PLMJ National Joint Ventures 
PLMJ has offices in Lisbon, Oporto and Faro and provides support through a National Partners Network in Coimbra, the Azores, Guimarães and Madeira.

Awards and Rankings 
PLMJ was named Law Firm of the Year in Portugal by the Chambers Europe Awards for Excellence 2014, an award it also won in 2012 and 2009. Also in 2014, it was named one of the leading and most innovative firms in Continental Europe according to the Financial Times. The Firm was also named Iberian Law Firm of the Year 2015 by the British magazine The Lawyer. PLMJ also won this award in 2012.

Many PLMJ lawyers are recognised by the leading international directories including Chambers and Partners Europe and Global, Legal 500, IFLR 1000 and Best Lawyers.

PLMJ Foundation 

The PLMJ Foundation is a non-profit institution that is a patrono of the visual arts in Portugal and other Portuguese-speaking countries.

The Foundation had its beginnings in the late 1990s. The firm began a collection of paintings, drawings and sculpture, which was later broadened to include photography and video. Under the motto “A law firm as a space for culture”, this collection became the PLMJ Foundation at the beginning of 2000.

The PLMJ Foundation was declared to be an institution of higher cultural interest by the Portuguese Minister of Culture and plays an important role in promoting visual arts in Portugal and in African countries where Portuguese is the official language. The PLMJ Foundation also focuses on supporting young artists and is already one of the major players on the Portuguese cultural scene. It is a source of discovery and promotion of contemporary artists in Portugal, Angola and Mozambique.

The Foundation's objective is to raise the profile of visual arts in Portugal by making regular acquisitions to build a collection that illustrates modern artistic output in the country. Its collections host artworks by well-known artists alongside the work of those at the beginning of their careers. This means the PLMJ Foundation boasts a wide variety of works in different media with their roots in a multitude of approaches to process and aesthetics.

The PLMJ Foundation also acts as a publisher and an exhibition organiser, again with a focus on young artists from every area of the visual arts. The embodiment of this approach is the multidisciplinary Opções & Futuros (Options & Futures) project begun in 2005.

In addition to its own activities, the Foundation also seeks to support or participate in the projects of other entities that fall within the objectives of its programme.

References

External links 
 PLMJ Law Firm

Law firms of Portugal